David Gbala was acting Deputy Speaker of the National Transitional Legislative Assembly of Liberia from 17 March 2005 to January 2006. He is from Grand Gedeh County.

Gbala replaced Eddington Varmah as Deputy Speaker.

See also
Politics of Liberia

References

Living people
Year of birth missing (living people)
Members of the National Transitional Legislative Assembly of Liberia
People from Grand Gedeh County
21st-century Liberian politicians